Gilbert Woodrow Scharffs (June 27, 1930 - February 26, 2015) was a Latter-day Saint religious educator and author.

Biography
Scharffs was born to Fritz and Louise Scharffs and raised in the Church of Jesus Christ of Latter-day Saints (LDS Church).  He served as a missionary in the German Mission of the LDS Church in the late 1950s, where he served as editor for publications and later second counselor to the Mission President.  In 1959 he was married in the Salt Lake Temple to Laura Virginia Smith, a granddaughter of LDS President Joseph F. Smith.  They would have four children, one of which, Brett, would become a legal scholar.

Scharffs received a B.A. in marketing from the University of Utah in the class of 1954, a master's degree in business from New York University, and a Ph.D. in religion from Brigham Young University (BYU) in 1969.  His doctoral research was on the history of Mormons in Germany, where Scharffs had served as a missionary, and his dissertation was published by Deseret Book in 1970.  Historian Donald Q. Cannon considers Scharffs' dissertation as part of the "major scholarly contribution to the study of Mormon history" that occurred during the 1960s.

For many years Scharffs taught with the Church Educational System (CES).  He was on the faculty of the Institute of Religion adjacent to the University of Utah for 27 years, having served as director following Reed C. Durham in 1974.  Scharffs also taught at BYU.

Among other callings in the church, Scharffs has served multiple times as a stake missionary, a bishop in the early 1990s, and a counselor in a stake presidency.

Writings

Books 

  Issued again in 1989, republished by Bookcraft in 1994.

Scharffs response to The God Makers is also available online at the Foundation for Apologetic Information and Research's website.

Articles

Other 
.
.
.
.

References

Sources
 
Meridian Magazine bio
FARMS bio listing
Millennial Press bio
Robert C. Freeman and Jon R. Felt. German Saints At War. (Springville, UT: Cedar Fort Inc., 2005) p. xiv
Daily Herald of Provo article that mentions Scharffs work

External links 
 Review of Mormonism in Germany by Douglas F. Tobler, published in BYU Studies
 

1930 births
2015 deaths
20th-century Mormon missionaries
American Latter Day Saint writers
American Mormon missionaries in Germany
Brigham Young University alumni
Brigham Young University faculty
Church Educational System instructors
Historians of the Latter Day Saint movement
Mormon apologists
New York University Stern School of Business alumni
University of Utah alumni
American leaders of the Church of Jesus Christ of Latter-day Saints
Latter Day Saints from New York (state)
Latter Day Saints from Utah